Vrhe is a small settlement in the Gorjanci Hills in the City Municipality of Novo Mesto in southeastern Slovenia. The area is part of the traditional region of Lower Carniola and is now included in the Southeast Slovenia Statistical Region.

Name
The name of the settlement was changed from Vrhe pri Dolžu to Vrhe in 1992.

References

External links
Vrhe on Geopedia

Populated places in the City Municipality of Novo Mesto